Abuso de confianza (English: Breach of Trust) is a 1950 Argentine  drama film directed by Mario C. Lugones and written by Julio Porter. It was based on the novel Abus de confiance by Pierre Wolff. Starring Manuel Alcón and Iris Alonso.

Cast
Manuel Alcón
Iris Alonso
Alejandro Anderson
María Armand
Carlos Bellucci
Mario Roque Benigno
Arnoldo Chamot
Manuel Collado
Margarita Corona
Renée Dumas
Celia Geraldy
Juan Latrónico
Adolfo Linvel
Sergio Malbrán
José Nájera
Juan Pecci
Nélida Romero
Maria Elena Sagrera
Carlos Thompson
Jorge Villoldo
Olga Zubarry
Dora Zular

Release
The film was released on 21 September 1950.

See also
Abused Confidence (1938)

External links
 

1950 films
Argentine black-and-white films
1950s Spanish-language films
1950 drama films
Remakes of French films
Argentine drama films
1950s Argentine films